Lake Ichkeul is a lake in northern Tunisia, located 20 kilometres (12 miles) to Bizerte, the northernmost city in Africa on the Mediterranean Sea. The lake and wetlands of Ichkeul National Park are an important stopping-over point for hundreds of thousands of migrating birds each year. Among the lake's visitors are ducks, geese, storks, and pink flamingoes. Dam construction on the lake's feeder rivers has produced major changes to the ecological balance of the lake and wetlands.

History

In the reign of the Hafsid dynasty, Lake Ichkuel was a reserve during the 13th century. It later became the property of the public domain in the early 20th century during French rule. Since 1980, it has been a UNESCO World Heritage Site.

Because dams have sharply reduced the freshwater inflow to the lakes and marshes, the reedbeds, sedges, and other fresh-water plant species have been replaced with salt-loving plants. These changes have produced a sharp reduction in the migratory bird populations, which depend on the mix of plants that used to exist.

According to the UNESCO Website, the Tunisian government has undertaken some steps to retain freshwater and reduce salinity, and the lake was removed from UNESCO's list of World heritage in danger in 2006.

However some reports from the World Conservation Union suggest that the salinity has already become excessively high and the possibility for rehabilitation may be rapidly disappearing.

Ichkeul National Park

Ichkeul National Park is a World Heritage Site located in the north of Tunisia, 25 km southwest of Bizerte and 15 km north of Mateur. The park has been on the UNESCO list of World Heritage Sites since 1980, and between 1996 and 2006 the park has also been on the group's list of World Heritage in Danger. The park is managed by the Ministry of Agriculture of Tunisia.

The flowering plant  Nabli found only in Tunisia was harvested in 1965 in the Park.

Gallery

References

External links 
 UNESCO website
 WCMC datasheet
 ACST Photos: Exploring Lak Ichkeul
 National Aeronautics and Space Administration

Bizerte
Ichkeul
National parks of Tunisia
World Heritage Sites in Tunisia
Biosphere reserves of Tunisia
Protected areas established in 1980
Archaeological sites in Tunisia
Ramsar sites in Tunisia
World Heritage Sites in Danger

sv:Ichkeul